Madison Records was an American record label. It was founded in 1958 by Larry Uttal.  It lasted until 1961 when Uttal absorbed the label into his newly acquired Bell Records.

Artists
The Bell Notes
Dante and the Evergreens
Nino and the Ebb Tides
Tico and the Triumphs
The Viscounts

References

See also
 Madison Records (Grey Gull) (earlier record label with the same name).

Defunct record labels of the United States
Record labels established in 1958
Record labels disestablished in 1961
1958 establishments in the United States